La Tale is a 2D side-scrolling online game developed by South Korean studio Actoz Soft. Gamers take the role of adventurers in a mythological fantasy world with three continents, Jiendia, Freios, and Eastland.

It was launched in South Korea in February 2006 where it was well received. In February 2007, Actoz entered into an agreement with Chinese game operator Shanda to open a server in mainland China. On March 18, 2008 OGPlanet signed a contract with Actoz Soft to bring La Tale to North America. Aeria Games launched La Tale in Europe on July 30, 2009, and closed the server on October 21, 2010.

Sign-ups for North America closed-beta testing began on July 10, 2008. Testers were selected from 22 July to 30 July. Closed-beta testing began on July 31, 2008 and ended on August 6, 2008. An open-beta test was held for fileplanet subscribers from August 15, 2008 to August 18, 2008. Official open-beta testing began on August 21, 2008 and ended on September 3, 2008. La Tale was officially released on September 18, 2008. La Tale was also published by GameNGame, but this version closed in May 2015. As of June 28, 2017, La Tale has been relaunched by Papaya Play.

Gameplay

Gameplay of La Tale is based on most MMORPGs. Players control a single character that combats monsters, obtains and completes quests, and participates in other activities. The game has a 2D side-scrolling setting similar to MapleStory and Ghost Online. The keyboard is used to hotkey character actions while the mouse is primarily used to speak to Non-player characters (NPCs), purchase items, and manipulate the items (via Enchants, Upgrades, etc.).

There are two types of currency in the North American version of La Tale: Ely and LTC. Ely is the normal in-game currency, used to buy equipment and other usable items. Ely is gained through killing monsters, selling items, and completing quests. LTC (An abbreviated version of "La Tale Coins") are the currency used to purchase fashion-shop items. LTC must be purchased through PapayaPlay, similar to buying NX Cash for Nexon products.

Gameplay and characters
One player account has three slots for characters. By purchasing an item called the Character Slot Card from either other players or the fashion shop, players can add up to eight more slots to their account. Players have the choice of choosing their character's gender, class, and appearance. Names are also given to characters at this point (be warned that even if a character is deleted, the name will not be reusable).

The game features Experience points. Experience points are gained through killing monsters and completing quests, though they can also be gained by saving at a Stone of Iris or Returning Stone.

Classes
There are 9 starting classes in La Tale. Each class specializes in one of the four stats in the game: Strength, which determines flinch rate and physical damage capability; Stamina, which determines HP and defense capability; Magic, which determines magical damage and magic defense; and Luck, which determines critical rate, Ely gain, and item drops.

References

External links
Official North American and International Homepage

2006 video games
Massively multiplayer online role-playing games
Video games developed in South Korea
Windows games
Windows-only games
Fantasy massively multiplayer online role-playing games
Aeria Games games
OGPlanet games